A constitutional referendum on the constitution of the First French Empire, with Napoleon I restored to power in place of Louis XVIII, was held on 22 April 1815. As in all previous French referendums, the officially announced result was nearly unanimous. Out of seven million eligible voters, 77.46% abstained that day.

Referendums in France
1815 in France
1815 referendums
Constitutional referendums in France
April 1815 events